Mario Pérez Zúñiga (born 17 June 1982) is a Mexican former footballer who played as a left-back.

Career

Club
Pérez played previously extensively in Mexico, for F.C. Atlas, Club Necaxa, San Luis F.C. and Club América. Pérez signed with Atlanta on 4 March 2011.

Pérez then signed for Mexican side Estudiantes Tecos by 10 June 2011.

International
Pérez has represented various Mexico national teams, including: 1999 U17 World Cup squad, 2004 Olympic squad, as well as the senior side.

Honours
Mexico U23
CONCACAF Olympic Qualifying Championship: 2004

References

1982 births
Living people
Mexico international footballers
Footballers at the 2004 Summer Olympics
Olympic footballers of Mexico
Club América footballers
San Luis F.C. players
Club Necaxa footballers
Atlas F.C. footballers
Atlanta Silverbacks players
Tecos F.C. footballers
North American Soccer League players
Expatriate soccer players in the United States
Mexico youth international footballers
Footballers from Mexico City
Association football defenders
Mexican footballers